The Global Research Collaboration for Infectious Disease Preparedness (GLOPID-R) is an international initiative to anticipate and prepare for future threats from infectious diseases. Founded in 2013, GLOPID-R is intended to be a means for facilitating communication and collaboration between its member bodies, not a funding or disaster response entity. Its secretariat is funded by the European Union through its Horizon 2020 initiative.

On February 11-12, 2020, GLOPID-R co-hosted an event with the World Health Organization called “2019 novel Coronavirus Global research and innovation forum: towards a research roadmap”.



Membership 
, GLOPID-R's member organizations were as follows:

References

External links 
  http://www.glopid-r.org/

International medical and health organizations
Disaster preparedness
2013 establishments